Kaleigh Quennec (born 15 February 1998) is a Canadian-Swiss ice hockey player and member of the Swiss national team, currently playing in the Réseau du sport étudiant du Québec (RSEQ) conference of U Sports with the Montreal Carabins women's ice hockey program.

Quennec represented Switzerland at the IIHF Women's World Championships in 2019 and 2021. As a junior player with the Swiss national under-18 team, she participated in the IIHF U18 Women's World Championships at the Division I Group A tournament in 2014 and at the Top Division tournaments in 2015 and 2016.

Personal life
Quennec played in the Swiss Mini A and Top Novizen leagues with the youth teams of Genève-Servette HC. During the 2016–17 season, she attended the Loomis Chaffee School in Windsor, Connecticut and played with the LC girls' varsity team in the New England Prep Division I league. 

Her father, Hugh Quennec, was the franchise owner and president of Genève-Servette HC during 2005 to 2017, and of Servette FC during 2012 to 2015.

References

External links
 

1998 births
Living people
Canadian people of Swiss descent
Loomis Chaffee School alumni
Montreal Carabins women's ice hockey players
Sportspeople from the canton of Fribourg
Swiss expatriate ice hockey people
Swiss expatriate sportspeople in Canada
Swiss people of Canadian descent
Swiss women's ice hockey forwards
Ice hockey players at the 2022 Winter Olympics
Olympic ice hockey players of Switzerland